Callum Taylor may refer to:

 Callum Taylor (English cricketer) (born 1997), English cricketer who plays for Essex
 Callum Taylor (Welsh cricketer) (born 1998), Welsh cricketer who plays for Glamorgan
 Callum Taylor (footballer) (born 2002), English footballer